The Lancashire and Cheshire Women's cricket team was the women's representative cricket team for the historic counties of Lancashire and Cheshire. They competed in the Women's Area Championship from 1980 to 1996 and in the Women's County Championship in 1997, after which they were replaced by individual teams representing Lancashire and Cheshire.

History
Lancashire and Cheshire Women played their first recorded match in 1930, in which they lost to Durham by 16 runs. The side went on to play various one-off matches, against various county and touring sides, before they joined the Women's Area Championship in 1980. Lancashire and Cheshire were one of the weaker sides in the Area Championship, with their best finishes coming in 1985, when they reached the Quarter-Finals, and in 1993, when they finished fifth. In 1997, they played in the inaugural Women's County Championship season, finishing 2nd in Division Two. The following season, however, the team was disbanded and replaced by individual sides representing Lancashire and Cheshire.

Players

Notable players
Players who played for Lancashire and Cheshire and played internationally are listed below, in order of first international appearance (noted in brackets):

 Avril Starling (1982)
 Carole Hodges (1982)
 Lesley Cooke (1986)
 Ruth Lupton (1995)
 Laura Newton (1997)
 Sarah Collyer (1998)

Seasons

Women's County Championship

See also
 Lancashire Women cricket team
 Cheshire Women cricket team
 List of defunct English women's cricket teams

References

Cricket in Lancashire
Cricket in Cheshire
Women's cricket teams in England